The Dionysian Mysteries were a ritual of ancient Greece and Rome which sometimes used intoxicants and other trance-inducing techniques (like dance and music) to remove inhibitions and social constraints, liberating the individual to return to a natural state. It also provided some liberation for men and women marginalized by Greek society, among which were slaves, outlaws, and non-citizens. In their final phase the Mysteries shifted their emphasis from a chthonic, underworld orientation to a transcendental, mystical one, with Dionysus changing his nature accordingly. By its nature as a mystery religion reserved for the initiated, many aspects of the Dionysian cult remain unknown and were lost with the decline of Greco-Roman polytheism; modern knowledge is derived from descriptions, imagery and cross-cultural studies.

Origins

The Dionysian Mysteries of mainland Greece and the Roman Empire are thought to have evolved from a more primitive initiatory cult of unknown origin (perhaps Thracian or Phrygian) which had spread throughout the Mediterranean region by the start of the Classical Greek period. Its spread was associated with the dissemination of wine, a sacrament or entheogen with which it appears always to have been closely associated (though mead may have been the original sacrament). Beginning as a simple rite, it evolved quickly within Greek culture into a popular mystery religion, which absorbed a variety of similar cults (and their gods) in a typically Greek synthesis across its territories; one late form was the Orphic Mysteries. However, all stages of this developmental spectrum appear to have continued in parallel throughout the eastern Mediterranean until late in Greek history and forcible Christianization.

Early Dionysus cult

The ecstatic cult of Dionysus was originally thought to be a late arrival in Greece from Thrace or Asia Minor, due to its popularity in both locations and Dionysus' non-integration into the Olympian Pantheon. After the deity's name was discovered on Mycenean Linear B tablets, however, this theory was abandoned and the cult is considered indigenous, predating Greek civilization. The absence of an early Olympian Dionysus is today explained by patterns of social exclusion and the cult's marginality, rather than chronology. Whether the cult originated on Minoan Crete (as an aspect of an ancient Zagreus) or Africa – or in Thrace or Asia, as a proto-Sabazius – is unanswerable, due to lack of evidence. Some scholars believe it was an adopted cult not native to any of these places and may have been an eclectic cult in its earliest history, although it almost certainly obtained many familiar features from Minoan culture.

Role of wine

The original rite of Dionysus (as introduced into Greece) is associated with a wine cult (not unlike the entheogenic cults of ancient Central America), concerned with the grapevine's cultivation and an understanding of its life cycle (believed to have embodied the living god) and the fermentation of wine from its dismembered body (associated with the god's essence in the underworld). Most importantly, however, the intoxicating and disinhibiting effects of wine were regarded as due to possession by the god's spirit (and, later, as causing this possession). Wine was also poured on the earth and its growing vine, completing the cycle. The cult was not solely concerned with the vine itself, but also with the other components of wine. Wine includes other ingredients (herbal, floral, and resinous) adding to its quality, flavour, and medicinal properties.

Scholars have suggested that, given the low alcoholic content of early wine, its effects may have been due to an additional psychoactive ingredient in its sacramental form, supported by iconography showing herbs being mixed with the wine in the kraters, especially preceding ecstatic behavior. Poppy, from which opium is extracted, is a likely candidate, being sometimes worn as a wreath by the god in art. Also, Honey and beeswax were often added to wine, introducing an even older drink (mead). Károly Kerényi postulated that this wine lore superseded (and partly absorbed) earlier Neolithic mead lore involving bee swarms associated by the Greeks with Dionysus. Mead and beer (with its cereal base) were incorporated into the domain of Dionysus, perhaps through his identification with the Thracian corn deity Sabazius.

Other plants believed to be viniculturally significant were also included in wine lore such as ivy (thought to counteract drunkenness—thus the opposite of the grapevine—and seen as blooming in winter instead of summer); the fig (a purgative of toxins) and the pine (a wine preservative). The bull (from whose horn wine was drunk) and goat (whose flesh provided wineskins, and whose browsing pruned the vines) were also part of the cult, eventually seen as manifestations of Dionysus. Some of these associations had been linked with fertility deities (like Dionysus) and became part of his new role. An understanding of vinicultural lore and its symbolism is key to understanding the cult which emerged from it, assuming a significance other than winemaking that would encompass life, death and rebirth and providing insight into human psychology.

Assuming the Dionysus cult arrived in Greece with the importation of wine, it probably first emerged about 6000 BC in one of two places—the Zagros Mountains and borderlands of Mesopotamia and Persia (with a rich wine culture via Asia Minor), or from wild vines on the mountain slopes of Libya and other regions in North Africa. The latter provided wine to ancient Egypt from about 2500 BC, and was home to ecstatic rites involving animal possession—notably the goat and panther men of the Aissaoua Sufi cult of Morocco (although this cult may have been influenced by the Dionysian one). In any case, Minoan Crete was the next link in the chain, importing wine from the Egyptians, Thracians, and Phoenicians and exporting it elsewhere. The Mysteries probably took shape in Minoan Crete from about 3000 to 1000 BC, since the name "Dionysus" exists nowhere other than Crete and Greece.

Rites

The rites were based on a seasonal death-rebirth theme, common among agricultural cults such as the Eleusinian Mysteries. The Osirian Mysteries paralleled the Dionysian, according to contemporary Greek and Egyptian observers. Spirit possession involved liberation from civilization's rules and constraints. It celebrated that which was outside civilized society and a return to primordial nature—which would later assume mystical overtones. It also involved escape from the socialized personality and ego into an ecstatic, deified state or the primal herd (sometimes both). In this sense Dionysus was the beast-god within, or the unconscious mind of modern psychology. Such activity has been interpreted as fertilizing, invigorating, cathartic, liberating and transformative, and so appealed to those on the margins of society: women, slaves, outlaws and "foreigners" (non-citizens, in Greek democracy). All were equal in a cult that inverted their roles, similar to the Roman Saturnalia.

The trance induction central to the cult involved not only chemognosis, but an "invocation of spirit" with the bullroarer and communal dancing to drum and pipe. The trances are described in familiar anthropological terms, with characteristic movements (such as the backward head flick found in all trance-inducing cults found today in Afro-American Vodou and its counterparts). As in Vodou rites, certain rhythms were associated with the trance. Rhythms are also found preserved in Greek prose referring to the Dionysian rites (such as Euripides' The Bacchae). This collection of classical quotes describes rites in the Greek countryside in the mountains, to which processions were made on feast days:
Following the torches as they dipped and swayed in the darkness, they climbed mountain paths with head thrown back and eyes glazed, dancing to the beat of the drum which stirred their blood' [or 'staggered drunkenly with what was known as the Dionysus gait']. 'In this state of ekstasis or enthusiasmos, they abandoned themselves, dancing wildly and shouting 'Euoi!' [the god's name] and at that moment of intense rapture became identified with the god himself. They became filled with his spirit and acquired divine powers.

This practice is demonstrated in Greek culture by the Bacchanals of the Maenads, Thyiades and Bacchoi; many Greek rulers considered the cult a threat to civilized society and wished to control it (if not suppress it altogether). The latter failed; the former would succeed in the foundation of a domesticated Dionysianism as a state religion in Athens. This was but one form of Dionysianism—a cult which assumed different forms in different localities (often absorbing indigenous divinities and their rites, as did Dionysus himself). The Greek Bacchoi claimed that, like wine, Dionysus had a different flavour in different regions; reflecting their mythical and cultural soil, he appeared under different names and appearances in different regions.

Dionysian paraphernalia

 Kantharos, drinking cup with large handles, originally the rhyton (drinking horn from a bull), later a kylix, or wine goblet
 Thyrsus, long wand with pine cone on top, carried by initiates and those possessed by the god
 Stave, once cast into ground to mark ritual space
 Krater, mixing bowl
 Flagellum, a scourge
 Minoan double axe, once used for sacrificial rites, later replaced by the Greek kopis (curved dagger)
 Retis, hunter's net
 Laurel crown and cloak, purple robe, or leopard or fawnskin nebix
 Hunting boots
 Persona masks
 Bullroarer
 Salpinx, long, straight trumpet
 Pan flute
 Tympanon, a frame drum
 Liknon, sacred basket with fig

Traditional offerings to Dionysus
Musk, civet, frankincense, storax, ivy, grapes, pine, fig, wine, honey, apples, Indian hemp, orchis root, thistle, all wild and domestic trees.

Animals sacred to Dionysus
Dionysus has numerous sacred animals, such as the leopard or bull. Other sacred animals include: Lions and other big cats, goats, donkeys, and serpents.

The bull and goat and their "enemies", the panther (or any big cat – after the Greeks colonized part of India, Shiva's tiger sometimes replaced the traditional panther or leopard) and the serpent (probably derived from Sabazius, but also found in North African cults); in addition, the dolphin, the lion, and the bee.

Bulls

Dionysus's association with bulls is found in multiple epithets. In The Bacchae, Penthus, who opposed his worship in the god's origin city of Thebes, saw horns upon Dionysus's head as he started to go mad.

Dionysus's epithets connected to bulls are as follows:

Taurokephalos/Taurokranos/Taurometôpos Greek: Ταυροφαγος; a surname of Dionysus in the Orphic mysteries. (Orph. Hymn. 51. 2.) It also occurs as a surname of rivers and the ocean, who were symbolically represented as bulls, to indicate their fertilising effect upon countries. (Eurip. Iphig. Aul. 275, Orest. 1378 ; Aelian, V. H. ii. 33; Horat. Carm. iv. 14, 25.)

Tauros; a bull, occurs as a surname of Dionysus. (Eurip. Bacch. 918 ; Athen. xi. p. 476; Plut. Quaest. Graec. 36 ; Lycoph. Cass. 209.)

Invocations of Dionysus (from the Orphic hymns)
"I call upon loud-roaring and revelling Dionysus,
primeval, double-natured, thrice-born, Bacchic lord,
wild, ineffable, secretive, two-horned and two-shaped.
Ivy-covered, bull-faced, warlike, howling, pure,
You take raw flesh, you have feasts, wrapt in foliage, decked with grape clusters.
Resourceful Eubouleus, immortal god sired by Zeus
When he mated with Persephone in unspeakable union.
Hearken to my voice, O blessed one,
and with your fair-girdled nymphs breathe on me in a spirit of perfect agape".

"In intoxication, physical or spiritual, the initiate recovers an intensity of feeling which prudence had destroyed; he finds the world full of delight and beauty, and his imagination is suddenly :liberated from the prison of everyday preoccupations. The Bacchic ritual produced what was called 'enthusiasm', which means etymologically having the god enter the worshipper, who believed :that he became one with the god".

Orphic Hymn XLIV. To Dionysus Bassareus
A Hymn
Come, blessed Dionysius [Dionysos], various nam'd, bull-fac'd, begot from Thunder, Bacchus [Bakkhos] fam'd.  Bassarian God, of universal might, whom swords, and blood, and sacred rage delight: In heav'n rejoicing, mad, loud-sounding God, furious inspirer, bearer of the rod: By Gods rever'd, who dwell'st with human kind, propitious come, with much-rejoicing mind.

Orphic Hymn XLV. To Liknitus Bacchus [Liknitos Dionysus]
The Fumigation from Manna.
Liknitan Bacchus [Liknitos Dionysos], bearer of the vine, thee I invoke to bless these rites divine: Florid and gay, of nymphs the blossom bright, and of fair Venus [Aphrodite], Goddess of delight, 'Tis thine mad footsteps with mad nymphs to beat, dancing thro' groves with lightly leaping feet: From Jove's [Zeus'] high counsels nurst by Proserpine [Persephoneia], and born the dread of all the pow'rs divine: Come, blessed pow'r, regard thy suppliant's voice, propitious come, and in these rites rejoice.

Orphic Hymn XLVI. To Bacchus Pericionius [Dionysus Perikionios]
The Fumigation from Aromatics. 
Bacchus Pericionius [Dionysos Perikionios], hear my pray'r, who mad'st the house of Cadmus once thy care, With matchless force, his pillars twining round, (when burning thunders shook the solid ground, In flaming, founding torrents borne along), propt by thy grasp indissolubly strong. Come mighty Bacchus to these rites inclin'd, and bless thy suppliants with rejoicing mind.

Inscription about the mysteries in Plovdiv

An ancient Roman inscription written in Ancient Greek dated to 253–255 AD were discovered in the Great Basilica at the Plovdiv (ancient Philippopolis). The inscription refers to the Dionysian Mysteries and also mentions Roman Emperors Valerian and Gallienus. It has been found on a large stele that was used as construction material during the building of the Great Basilica.

See also
Anthesteria, Ascolia, Dionysia, and Lenaia
Ancient Greece and wine
Ancient Rome and wine
Bacchanalia and Liberalia
Dionysus Cup
Greco-Roman mysteries
Hellenistic religion
Theatre Of Dionysus
Tyrnavos, a Greek town, famous for its Dionysian-derived carnival celebrations

References

Further reading 
Hillman, D.C.A., The Chemical Muse: Drug Use and the Roots of Western Civilization (MacMillan, 2014). 
 Merkelbach, Reinhold, Die Hirten des Dionysos. Die Dionysos-Mysterien der römischen Kaiserzeit und der bukolische Roman des Longus (Stuttgart, Teubner, 1988).
 Padilla, Mark William (editor), "Rites of Passage in Ancient Greece: Literature, Religion, Society", Bucknell University Press, 1999. 
 Brigitte Le Guen, Les Associations de Technites dionysiaques à l'époque hellénistique, 2 vol. (Nancy, 2001).
 Sophia Aneziri, Die Vereine der dionysischen Techniten im Kontext der hellenistischen Gesellschaft (Stuttgart, 2003).
 Michael B. Cosmopoulos (ed), Greek Mysteries: the archaeology and ritual of ancient Greek secret cults (London, Routledge, 2003).
Muraresku, Brian C. The Immortality Key: The Secret History of the Religion with No Name. Macmillan USA. 2020. 
 Delneri, Francesca, I culti misterici stranieri nei frammenti della commedia attica antica (Bologna, Patron Editore, 2006) (Eikasmos, Studi, 13).
 Giovanni Casadio and Patricia A. Johnston (eds), Mystic Cults in Magna Graecia (Austin, TX, University of Texas Press, 2009).
 Hugh Bowden, Mystery Cults of the Ancient World (Princeton, Princeton UP, 2010).
 Richard Noll, Mysteria: Jung and the Ancient Mysteries (unpublished page proofs, 1994).

Dionysus
Cult of Dionysus
Greco-Roman mysteries